Little Lord Fauntleroy is a 1914 British silent drama film directed by Floyd Martin Thornton and starring H. Agar Lyons, Gerald Royston in the title role, and Jane Wells. It was based on the 1886 novel "Little Lord Fauntleroy" by Frances Hodgson Burnett. The film was produced by the Natural Colour Kinematograph Company. It was distributed in the UK by Kineto Ltd. and released in the US by Shubert Feature Film (later World Film Company) in April of that year. It was one of the first feature-length films to be made in colour, using the Kinemacolor two-colour additive colour process.

Originally, Joan Morgan had been considered for the part of Cedric Erroll as Lord Fauntleroy, before 13-year old Gerald Royston was given the role. Born in 1901 and the younger brother of Roy Royston, the British child actor appeared in silent films from 1913 to 1915. His casting in Little Lord Fauntleroy was one of the earliest starring roles for a child actor in a feature-length film.

An advertisement in the cinema trade journal Bioscope cited English writer Effie Albanesi's praise of the film. She called it "excellent" and commended the film's adaptation of Burnett's novel, saying, "the acting of the boy [Royston] was wonderful".

Cast
 H. Agar Lyons as Earl of Dorincourt  
 Gerald Royston as Cedric Erroll (Lord Fauntleroy)
 Jane Wells as 'Dearest' Erroll  
 Bernard Vaughan as Lawyer Havisham  
 V. Osmond as Minna Tipton  
 Frank Stather as Ben Tipton  
 D. Callam as Tommy Tipton  
 Harry Edwards as Dick Tipton  
 F. Tomkins as Silas Hobbs  
 Miss Nelson as Mary - the Housemaid  
 Fred Eustace as Bevis  
 B. Murray as Maurice  
 Edward Viner as Capt. Cedric Erroll  
 Stella St. Audrie as Bridget  
 John East as Thomas  
 Jack Denton

References

External links
 

1914 films
1914 drama films
1910s color films
British silent feature films
British drama films
Silent films in color
1910s English-language films
Films based on works by Frances Hodgson Burnett
Films directed by Floyd Martin Thornton
Films set in London
Films based on American novels
Films based on British novels
1910s British films
Silent drama films